Sebastian Brodrick (born 9 July 1938) is a Nigerian footballer. He competed in the men's tournament at the 1968 Summer Olympics.

References

External links
 

1938 births
Living people
Nigerian footballers
Nigeria international footballers
Olympic footballers of Nigeria
Footballers at the 1968 Summer Olympics
Sportspeople from Benin City
Association football forwards